John Michael Cronin MNZM is a New Zealand politician.  he is the chairperson of the Bay of Plenty regional council, one of four councillors elected by the city of Tauranga. He was not successful in either attempt.

Cronin is one of the proponents of the proposed move of the regional council offices from Whakatane, to a green field site in Tauranga, a moved expected to cost ratepayers over NZ$23 million.

He was award MNZM in the 2009 New Year Honours, for services to local body affairs and the community.

References

Living people
New Zealand city councillors
Members of the New Zealand Order of Merit
People from Tauranga
Year of birth missing (living people)
New Zealand National Party politicians
Unsuccessful candidates in the 1996 New Zealand general election
Unsuccessful candidates in the 1993 New Zealand general election